Silent Service may refer to:
 Royal Navy Submarine Service or Silent Service, the submarine element of the Royal Navy
 Silent Service (video game), a 1985 video game
 The Silent Service, a 1988 Japanese manga and anime series
 The Silent Service (TV series), a 1957 drama television series
 The Silent Service (book), a 1944 nonfiction book by Ion Idriess
 The Silent Service, a series of books by H. Jay Riker